Almaytū is a village in Afghanistan, located in Jaghori, Ghazni Province.

Demographics 
The people of Almaytū are all Hazaras of Jaghori tribe and their language is Farsi (Hazaragi dialect).

See also 
 Jaghori
 Ghazni Province

Gallery

References 

Jaghori District
Populated places in Ghazni Province
Villages in Afghanistan